The following is a chronological list of mayors of Hamburg, a city-state in Germany. The mayors are the head of the city-state, part of the government of Hamburg. Since 1861, according to the constitution of 28 September 1860, the state has been governed by the ten-member Senate, which had previously been called the council (in the German language of that time: Rath). It is headed by the First Mayor of Hamburg (German title: Erster Bürgermeister der Freien und Hansestadt Hamburg) as the President of the Senate. The deputy is the Second Mayor.

For much of its history, Hamburg was a free imperial city and later a sovereign state; the position of First Mayor historically was equivalent to that of a sovereign head of state. In the 1871–1918 German Empire, the Hamburg First Mayor was equivalent to the federal princes of the 23 German monarchies (4 of whom held the title of King and the others holding titles such as Grand Duke, Duke or Sovereign Prince). Since 1918, the position is equivalent to that of the ministers-president of the (West) German states.

Prior to World War I, the two mayors were elected for one-year terms. Until 1997, the First Mayor was primus inter pares among, and was elected by, the members of the Senate. Since then, the Hamburg Parliament (German: Hamburgische Bürgerschaft) has elected the First Mayor; the First Mayor is able to appoint and dismiss other senators.

1293–1860
The function of burgomaster (mayor) was usually held simultaneously by three persons, serving as an executive college. One of the three being burgomaster in chief for a year, the second being the prior burgomaster in chief, the third being the upcoming one. Therefore, sometimes up to three names are mentioned for one year, since the names of the three appear in deeds, signed with or mentioning their names. The names in the list from 1239 until 1820 were archived in a book by Johann August Meister (1820). This is an incomplete list of burgomasters and uses the spelling in Meister's book, which is preserved in the Hamburg state library. After 1820 the list were added by hand. On 6 August 1806 Hamburg gained sovereignty as an independent country. From 1811 to 1814 Hamburg was part of France in the Bouches-de-l'Elbe.

If another reference is not noted, all mayors are taken from: Domizlaff. Das Hamburger Rathaus.

Hamburg (1860–1919) 
Since 1860 Hamburg had a constitution. Members of the Hamburg senate were elected by the Hamburg Parliament—not coopted by the existing senate. They were lifelong members of the senate. From the three eldest and juristic trained members the senate elected annually the First Mayor of Hamburg (German title: Erster Bürgermeister der Freien und Hansestadt Hamburg) – the presiding head – and his deputy (Second Mayor of the Free and Hanseatic city of Hamburg, German title: Zweiter Bürgermeister der Freien und Hansestadt Hamburg).

Description of the method

All mayors are taken from Domizlaff: Das Hamburger Rathaus and are listed in Erste Bürgermeister Hamburgs 1507–2008, only changes in dates are marked by an added reference.

German Reich (1871–1945)

German Empire (1871–1918) 

 Second Mayor

Weimar Republic (1919–1933) 

During the German Revolution of 1918–1919 an Arbeiter- und Soldatenrat (Council of the Workers and Soldiers) was formed. From 12 November 1918 to 1919, a chairman was the head of state and city government: Heinrich Lauffenberg (−1919), Carl Hense (1919). This is not mentioned in Domizlaff: Das Hamburger Rathaus. The period in Germany after the First World War until the takeover of power – by the Nazi Party in 1933 – is called Weimar Republic. The Hamburg Parliament was democratically elected.
First Mayor of Hamburg

Second Mayor of Hamburg

Nazi Germany (1933–1945) 
In Nazi Germany the "Law on the Reconstruction of the Reich" (Gesetz über den Neuaufbau des Reiches) of 30 January 1934 abandoned the concept of a federal republic. The political institutions of the Länder were abolished altogether, passing all powers to the central government. The Hamburg Parliament was dissolved. The First Mayor was appointed by the Reich Interior Minister, though Hitler himself reserved the right to appoint him (as was also the case with Berlin and Vienna). The actual head of the Hamburg executive was the Reichsstatthalter (Regional Governor) Karl Kaufmann (1933–1945).

Second Mayor 

Colonel Robert Gordon Kitchen VI, Governor of Hamburg during the control of the British Army 1945–1946.

Hamburg (1945–present) 

Mayors during the federal parliamentary republic of Germany.

 First Mayor and President of the Senate of Hamburg
Political party:

Second Mayor of Hamburg

Notes and references

General

(1293–1977)   (Note: not included in the 2nd edition.)

History of Hamburg
Government of Hamburg
Mayors
Hamburg